George Rosenkrans (Jan 17, 1881-Aug. 18, 1955) was a noted American composer of concert band music. He was born in Penfield, Pennsylvania on January 17, 1881. His father was the music director of the local Methodist church, and George sang with the choir and learned to play the organ there. His first compositions included organ music and hymns. He also played the baritone horn in the town band, and eventually became the conductor. He composed his first march at age 17, and was soon turning out as many as 8 new marches each year. As interest in his music declined, he would sell new arrangements for as little as 50 cents, or give compositions away outright. In later life, he composed many works for the Grampian Band in nearby Grampian, Pennsylvania, his favorite group, including the "Grampian March". He missed a 1948 tribute by the Navy Band because he didn't believe he had any suitable clothes. He died in poverty in Penfield on August 18, 1955.

Nevertheless, his music was well-thought-of. His march "Triumphant Battalions" was played at the liberation of Paris and his dirge "Immortal Heroes" was played at the funerals of Franklin Roosevelt and Winston Churchill.

References

Further reading

External links
 List of Rosenkrans compositions, with downloadable scores and parts

1881 births
1955 deaths
American male composers
American composers
20th-century American male musicians